The Meixi River Bridge is an arch bridge which crosses the Meixi River in Fengjie, Chongqing, China. It replaced an earlier suspension bridge across the river built in 1990. The bridge spans  ranking among the longest arch bridges in the world. The bridge is located very near the end of the river and can be seen by boats travelling along the Yangtze River.

See also
List of longest arch bridge spans
Meixi River Expressway Bridge

External links
https://web.archive.org/web/20121113220849/http://highestbridges.com/wiki/index.php?title=Meixihe_River_2000_Bridge

References

Bridges in Chongqing
Arch bridges in China
Bridges completed in 2000